Archbishop Nathaniel (secular name William George Popp; born June 12, 1940) is a Romanian Orthodox clergyman, the current Archbishop of the Orthodox Church in America's Romanian Episcopate of America.

Born to a Romanian-American family in Aurora, Illinois, he was ordained to the priesthood in 1966, in the Romanian Greek-Catholic Church. He soon left the Catholic Eastern Rite and, under the guidance of Archbishop Valerian Trifa of the Romanian Orthodox Episcopate of America, converted to Orthodoxy on February 15, 1968. After residing in a monastic community for several years, Fr. Popp became the rector of Holy Cross Romanian Orthodox Church in Hermitage, Pennsylvania.

On November 15, 1980, Fr. Nathaniel was consecrated Bishop of Dearborn Heights, as an auxiliary bishop to Archbishop Valerian Trifa. He served as Bishop until 1984, when Abp. Valerian retired. On November 17, 1984, Bishop Nathaniel became the ruling hierarch of the Romanian Orthodox Episcopate of America; on October 20, 1999, the Holy Synod of the OCA elevated him to the rank of Archbishop.

Archbishop Nathaniel traveled to Romania in May 2003, where he was awarded an Honorary Doctorate from the University of Oradea. Following the resignation of Metropolitan Jonah (Paffhausen) in July 2012, Bishop Nathaniel was appointed as the locum tenens of the OCA.

References

External links
 Biography

1940 births
Living people
Bishops of the Orthodox Church in America
Converts to Eastern Orthodoxy from Catholicism
People from Aurora, Illinois
American people of Romanian descent
Bishops of the Romanian Orthodox Church
Former Roman Catholics